The mixed team compound archery competition at the 2018 Asian Games was held from 22 to 27 August at Gelora Bung Karno Archery Field.

A total of 17 teams participated in the ranking round to determine the seeds for knockout round.

Ranking round classification was ranked based on the combined score of the best men and women archer in the individual ranking round.

Schedule
All times are Western Indonesia Time (UTC+07:00)

Results

Ranking round

Knockout round

Finals

Top half

Bottom half

References

External links
Official website

Mixed team compound